The Armoured Corps of the Pakistan Army is a combat branch tasked with armoured warfare. Equipped with more than 3,742 main battle tanks, the corps is headquartered in the garrison town of Nowshera, Khyber-Pakhtunkhwa. The corps has only administrative control of its component regiments. The regiments are deployed in a number of field formations including two armoured divisions, two mechanised divisions, and a number of independent armoured brigades.

The corps has a history going back to September 1773, when its oldest unit, the Governor General's Bodyguard, was raised in British India. The corps maintains a number of  units, who earned fame in numerous wars and engagements as part of the British Indian Army including in the two World Wars. At the time of the independence, Pakistan inherited six armoured regiments from the old British Indian Army.

Since then, the corps has expanded into more than forty regiments. Many of these new regiments have also earned accolades for their performance in wars fought with India. The corps played a minor role in 1947-48 and a major role in the 1965 and 1971 wars with India. Later on, the Corps played a crucial part in terms of deterrence when the Pakistani Army has mobilised repeatedly in the face of various Indian build-ups on the border. These include Operation Brasstacks in 1986-87 and Operation Parakram in 2001–02. The Corps also took part in Operation Zarb-e-Azb against terrorist groups in the North-Western part of Pakistan.

The Corps has a major presence along the India-Pakistan border and a minor presence along the Afghanistan-Pakistan border.

Regiments in the Corps

 President's Bodyguard
 4th Cavalry (Valiants)
 5th Horse (Probyn's Horse)
 6th Lancers (Fateh Khem Karan)
 7th Lancers
 8th Cavalry (Izz-Ul-Khail)
 9th Horse (The Arabian Horse)
 Guides Cavalry (Frontier Force)
 11th Cavalry (Frontier Force)
 12th Cavalry (Frontier Force)
 13th Lancers (Spearheads)
 14th Lancers (Zarb-e-Ghazi)
 15th Lancers (Baloch)
 16th Horse (Al-Mugheerat)
 17th Lancers
 18th Horse
 19th Lancers
 20th Lancers (Haideri)
 21st Horse (Murtajiz)
 22nd Cavalry (Death or Glory)
 23rd Cavalry (Frontier Force)
 24th Cavalry (Frontier Force) (Chargers)
 25th Cavalry (Frontier Force) (Men of Steel)
 26th Cavalry (Mustangs)
 27th Cavalry (Ribat-ul-Khail) Steeds of war
 28th Cavalry
 29th Cavalry (Tigers)

 30th Cavalry (Bold Till Death)
 31st Cavalry (Sprocketeers)
 32nd Cavalry (Conquerers)
 33rd Cavalry (Fortunes with the Bold)
 34th Lancers (Dragoons)(Tawakkal-Ullah)
 35th Cavalry
 36th Cavalry
 37th Cavalry (Ribat-us-Sehra)
 38th Cavalry
 39th Cavalry
 40th Horse (Sind)
 41st Horse (Frontier Force) (Karakash)
 42th Lancers
 43rd Cavalry (al-Zarib) (Raised 2015)
 44th Cavalry (Hell on Wheels) (Raised 2016)
 45th Horse (Alambardar)
 47th Cavalry
 51st Lancers (Silver Eagles)
 52nd Cavalry
 53rd Cavalry (Golden Eagle)
 54th Cavalry (Hizbullah)
 55th Cavalry (Adham)
 56th Cavalry (Raad ul Harb)
 57th Cavalry
 58th Cavalry

Equipment 
Armoured Corps regiments are equipped with the following:

The VT4 is a Chinese third-generation MBT specifically made for export.
The Al-Khalid main battle tank is a joint Sino-Pakistani production with a 125 mm smoothbore gun.
The T-80UD is of Ukrainian origin with a 125 mm smoothbore gun.
 The Al-Zarrar is a heavily upgraded version of the Chinese Type 59 tank equipped with a 125mm smoothbore cannon, ERA, and many more modern equipment.
The T-85III is an upgraded version of the Chinese T-85AP with a 125 mm smoothbore gun.
The Type 69 tank is a Chinese MBT with a 105 mm gun.

See also
 Azad Kashmir Regiment 
 Baloch Regiment
 Frontier Force Regiment
 Northern Light Infantry Regiment
 Punjab Regiment
 Sindh Regiment

References

External links
Pakistan Armoured Corps on www.regiments.org

Pakistan Armoured Corps
Nationstate armoured warfare branches
Military units and formations established in 1947
1947 establishments in Pakistan
Armour